| langs            = 
| rels= Islam (predominantly Sunni/Shia Islam)
| related = | native_name = Sayyid/Syed

The Sadaat Amroha or Amrohi SAYYID or SAYYID OF AMROHA() are a community of Sayyids, historically settled in the town of Amroha, in the Indian state of Uttar Pradesh. Many members of the community migrated to Pakistan after independence and settled in Karachi,Sindh, Bewal- Rawalpindi - through Syed Dewan Shah Abdul Baqi Guzri Bewali bin Syed Abdul Wahid Guzri (Amroha) some descendants of whom settled in Azad Kashmir, from which some now also reside in The U.K. .

History 

The town of Amroha is home to one of the oldest Naqvi Sadat settlements in India. Naqvis in Amroha arrived from Wasit, Iraq and have resided in the town of Amroha since A.D. 1190.

The Sadaat Amroha belong mainly to the Naqvi sub-group, because they are descendants of the Sufi saint Syed Sharfuddin Shah Wilayat (a true 9th direct descendant of Imam Ali Al-Naqi), who was a highly respected religious figure in Wasit, Iraq, and later in India during the early ages of Islam in the South Asia and the khalifa of Imam Suhrawardi. The majority of Amrohvie Sadaat are Naqvi, predominantly of Sunni sects. According to the 1901 Census of India, the main sub-division of the Sayyid was the Husseini and Naqvi.

Syed Hussain Sharfuddin Shah Wilayat Naqvi 

Syed Hussain Sharfuddin Shah Wilayat Naqvi was a prominent 13th-century Sufi or Makhdoom. He is the ninth descendant of Imam Ali al-Naqi al-Hadi.

Local legend says that the animals who live in his mazar (shrine), especially scorpions, never harm humans.

Present circumstances 

The Sadaat Amroha are divided among those that remained in India and those that emigrated to Pakistan. The Anjuman Sadaat Amroha is the community's main organization.

They joined the South Asian diaspora, with communities in North America. The Sadaat Amroha speak Urdu and rarely use dialects such as Khari boli.

See also

Saadat-e-Bara
Sadaat-e-Bilgram
Syed Nagli

References

External links 

 Sadat-e-Amroah Pakistan

Hashemite people
Muslim communities of Uttar Pradesh
Muhajir communities
Sufism in India
People from Amroha